The Killing Fields are a number of sites in Cambodia where collectively more than one million people were killed and buried by the Khmer Rouge regime (the  Communist Party of Kampuchea) during its rule of the country from 1975 to 1979, immediately after the end of the Cambodian Civil War (1970–1975). The mass killings were part of a broad state-sponsored genocide (the Cambodian genocide).

Analysis of 20,000 mass grave sites by the DC-Cam Mapping Program and Yale University indicates at least 1,386,734 victims of execution. Estimates of the total deaths resulting from Khmer Rouge policies, including death from disease and starvation, range from 1.7 to 2.5 million out of a 1975 population of roughly 8 million. In 1979, Vietnam invaded Democratic Kampuchea and toppled the Khmer Rouge regime, ending the genocide.

The Cambodian journalist Dith Pran coined the term "killing fields" after his escape from the regime.

The Khmer Rouge regime arrested and eventually executed almost everyone suspected of connections with the former government or with foreign governments, as well as professionals and intellectuals. Ethnic Vietnamese, ethnic Thai, ethnic Chinese, ethnic Cham, Cambodian Christians, and Buddhist monks were the demographic targets of persecution. As a result, Pol Pot has been described as "a genocidal tyrant". Martin Shaw described the Cambodian genocide as "the purest genocide of the Cold War era".

Ben Kiernan estimates that about 1.7 million people were killed. Researcher Craig Etcheson of the Documentation Center of Cambodia suggests that the death toll was between 2 and 2.5 million, with a "most likely" figure of 2.2 million. After five years of researching some 20,000 grave sites, he concludes that "these mass graves contain the remains of 1,386,734 victims of execution". A United Nations investigation reported 2–3 million dead, while UNICEF estimated 3 million had been killed.  Demographic analysis by Patrick Heuveline suggests that between 1.17 and 3.42 million Cambodians were killed, while Marek Sliwinski suggests that 1.8 million is a conservative figure. Even the Khmer Rouge acknowledged that 2 million had been killed—though they attributed those deaths to a subsequent Vietnamese invasion. By late 1979, UN and Red Cross officials were warning that another 2.25 million Cambodians faced death by starvation due to "the near destruction of Cambodian society under the regime of ousted Prime Minister Pol Pot", who were saved by international aid after the Vietnamese invasion.

Process

The judicial process of the Khmer Rouge regime, for minor or political crimes, began with a warning from the Angkar, the government of Cambodia under the regime. People receiving more than two warnings were sent for "re-education," which meant near-certain death. People were often encouraged to confess to Angkar their "pre-revolutionary lifestyles and crimes" (which usually included some kind of free-market activity; having had contact with a foreign source, such as a U.S. missionary, international relief or government agency; or contact with any foreigner or with the outside world at all), being told that Angkar would forgive them and "wipe the slate clean." They were then taken away to a place such as Tuol Sleng or Choeung Ek for torture and/or execution.

The executed were buried in mass graves. In order to save ammunition, the executions were often carried out using poison or improvised weapons such as sharpened bamboo sticks, hammers, machetes and axes. 
Inside the Buddhist Memorial Stupa at Choeung Ek, there is evidence of bayonets, knives, wooden clubs, hoes for farming and curved scythes being used to kill victims, with images of skulls, damaged by these implements, as evidence. 
In some cases the children and infants of adult victims were killed by having their heads bashed against the trunks of Chankiri trees, and then were thrown into the pits alongside their parents. The rationale was "to stop them growing up and taking revenge for their parents' deaths."

Some victims were required to dig their own graves; their weakness often meant that they were unable to dig very deep. The soldiers who carried out the executions were mostly young men or women from peasant families.

Prosecution for crimes against humanity
In 1997 the Cambodian government asked for the UN's assistance in setting up a genocide tribunal. It took nine years to agree to the shape and structure of the court—a hybrid of Cambodian and international laws—before the judges were sworn in, in 2006. The investigating judges were presented with the names of five possible suspects by the prosecution on 18 July 2007. On 19 September 2007 Nuon Chea, second in command of the Khmer Rouge and its most senior surviving member, was charged with war crimes and crimes against humanity. He faced Cambodian and foreign judges at the special genocide tribunal and was convicted on 7 August 2014 and received a life sentence. On 26 July 2010 Kang Kek Iew (aka Comrade Duch), director of the S-21 prison camp, was convicted of crimes against humanity and sentenced to 35 years' imprisonment. His sentence was reduced to 19 years, as he had already spent 11 years in prison. On 2 February 2012, his sentence was extended to life imprisonment by the Extraordinary Chambers in the Courts of Cambodia. He died on 2 September 2020.

Legacy
The best known monument of the Killing Fields is at the village of Choeung Ek. Today, it is the site of a Buddhist memorial to the victims, and Tuol Sleng has a museum commemorating the genocide. The memorial park at Choeung Ek has been built around the mass graves of many thousands of victims, most of whom were executed after interrogation at the S-21 Prison in Phnom Penh. The majority of those buried at Choeung Ek were Khmer Rouge killed during the purges within the regime. Many dozens of mass graves are visible above ground, many which have not been excavated yet. Commonly, bones and clothing surface after heavy rainfalls due to the large number of bodies still buried in shallow mass graves. It is not uncommon to run across the bones or teeth of the victims scattered on the surface as one tours the memorial park. If these are found, visitors are asked to notify a memorial park officer or guide. 

A survivor of the genocide, Dara Duong, founded The Killing Fields Museum in Seattle, US.

See also
 Alive in the Killing Fields – book
 Enemies of the People (film)
 First Indochina War
 First They Killed My Father – by Loung Ung
 Son Sen
 Ta Mok
 Vietnam War
 Crimes against humanity under communist regimes
 Mass killings under communist regimes
 Funan

References

External links
Cambodia Killing Fields Memorial – An exhibit based in Seattle, US, dedicated to preserving the history of the Killing Fields.
Cambodia Tribunal Monitor
Photographs from S-21 – Photographs from Tuol Sleng (S-21)
Denise Affonço: To The End Of Hell: One Woman's Struggle to Survive Cambodia's Khmer Rouge. (With Introduction by Jon Swain.)  .
 Dark memories of Cambodia's killing spree BBC News commemorating the 30th anniversary of the Khmer Rouge's demise
Setan and Randa Lee with Shelba Hammond: Miracles in the Forgotten Land and Beyond.  

Cambodian genocide
 
Religious persecution by communists
Genocide of indigenous peoples
Ethnic persecution
Persecution of intellectuals